Gottlob E. Weiss (March 25, 1820 – April 19, 1900) was an American politician.

Born in Saxony, Weiss moved to Wayne, Wisconsin Territory in 1847 and lived there until 1853; he moved to Milwaukee, Wisconsin in 1853. In 1854, Weiss moved to West Bend, Wisconsin. He served as sheriff of Washington County, Wisconsin in 1855 and 1856, and he became sheriff of Ozaukee County in 1856. Weiss returned to Milwaukee in 1857. In 1873, Weiss served in the Wisconsin State Assembly as a Democrat. He was an accountant. Weiss died on April 19, 1900 and was buried at Forest Home Cemetery in Milwaukee.

References

External links

1820 births
1900 deaths
German emigrants to the United States
People from Saxony
Politicians from Milwaukee
People from West Bend, Wisconsin
Businesspeople from Milwaukee
Wisconsin sheriffs
People from Washington County, Wisconsin
People from Ozaukee County, Wisconsin
19th-century American politicians
19th-century American businesspeople
Democratic Party members of the Wisconsin State Assembly